On a simple east/west basis, Western Oklahoma is popularly considered that part of the state west of I-35.  I-35 creates a north/south line through the approximate center of the main body of the state (i.e., without regard for the Oklahoma Panhandle), passing through Oklahoma City, the state capital.

However, other definitions are possible.  For tourism purposes, the Oklahoma Tourism and Recreation Department breaks the state into six regions.  The 14 counties of Southwest Oklahoma, called Great Plains Country, do all fit west of I-35, including the easternmost counties in the grouping, Stephens and Jefferson.  But, while most of the 16 counties of Northwest Oklahoma, called Red Carpet Country, are also west of I-35, the two easternmost in that grouping, Kay and Noble,  each have some land area east of I-35.  Then, the department includes 12 counties in Central Oklahoma, called Frontier Country, around Oklahoma City.  Portions of that grouping, like Canadian County, are entirely west of I-35.  And, the department has established a South Central grouping of 7 counties, called Chickasaw Country, some of which, like Carter County, have more land west of I-35 than east.

References

Regions of Oklahoma